Stavanger Ishall, also known as Siddishallen is an indoor ice hockey arena in Stavanger, Norway. It was built in 1968, as only the second arena ice hockey venue in Norway, and has a capacity of 3,090 people. The arena used to host the home games of ice hockey team Stavanger Oilers until 2012 when the team moved to newly built DNB Arena.

References

External links

Indoor arenas in Norway
Indoor ice hockey venues in Norway
Sports venues in Stavanger
1968 establishments in Norway
Sports venues completed in 1968
Stavanger Oilers
Figure skating venues in Norway